Monte Roberto is a comune (municipality) in the Province of Ancona in the Italian region Marche, located about  southwest of Ancona.

Monte Roberto borders the following municipalities: Castelbellino, Cupramontana, Jesi, Maiolati Spontini, San Paolo di Jesi.

Twin towns
   Fontanil, France, since 1992

References

Cities and towns in the Marche